Echeveria multicaulis (also known as copper leaf and copper rose) is a species of plant native to Mexico. It is a member of the genus Echeveria.

Etymology
Echeveria is named for Atanasio Echeverría y Godoy, a botanical illustrator who contributed to Flora Mexicana.

Multicaulis literally translates to 'many-stemmed', a reference to its growth habit.

References

External links

multicaulis
Flora of Mexico